Cyperus crispulus is a sedge of the family Cyperaceae that is native to  Australia and found in Western Australia, and  the Northern Territory.

It is found in rock crevices amongst sandstone outcrops in the Kimberley region of Western Australia.

The species was first described in 1991 by Karen Wilson. There are no synonyms.

See also
List of Cyperus species

References

External links 

 Cyperus crispulus occurrence data from Australasian Virtual Herbarium

Plants described in 1991
Flora of Western Australia
crispulus
Taxa named by Karen Louise Wilson
Flora of the Northern Territory